Mahanayim is a kibbutz in northern Israel. Located in the Korazim Plateau, around three kilometres northeast of Rosh Pinna, it falls under the jurisdiction of Upper Galilee Regional Council.

History
The land on which Mahanayim stands was purchased in 1892 by the Ahavat Zion (Love of Zion) Hovevei Zion organization, with the aim of establishing a moshava in the area. In 1898 a number of families from Galicia settled in the area, naming it Mahanayim after the biblical city in Gilead, where Jacob stayed before he met again with his brother Esau and saw angels, therefore calling it Mahanayim (camps) of God (Genesis 32:2). However, it was not a success, largely due to the settlers' lack of familiarity with the region, a shortage of money, and a lack of professionalism, resulting in the community disintegrating. The Jewish Colonization Association ran a trial of growing tobacco in the area, but it too was a failure, and the village was abandoned in 1912.

In 1916 a kvutza of Poale Zion members arrived in the area, establishing the first working settlement in the Upper Galilee. According to the 1922 census of Palestine by the British Mandate authorities, Mahanayim had a population of 30 Jews. In the same year it became a moshav, but was abandoned in 1928. The village was established for a third time in 1939 by members of kibbutz "Yodfat" from Safed.

Starting in 1979, the community's metalworks was used by Meir Dagan (later head of the Mossad) as a site to secretly assemble bombs to be used by proxies in the civil war in nearby Lebanon.

Economy
Kibbutz Mahanayim operates a guesthouse offering alternative medical treatments. A sculpture studio and stained glass workshop on the grounds of the kibbutz are open to guests.

Ben Ya'akov Airport is located to the south of the kibbutz.

Notable residents
 Israel Tal, IDF commander and pioneer in tank warfare.
 In 2013, a member of Mahanayim, Penny Ur, was awarded an OBE by the Queen of the United Kingdom for her contribution to English language teaching.
 Meir Dagan (later head of the Mossad)

References

External links
Village website
Kibbutz Mahanayim Collection on the Digital collections of Younes and Soraya Nazarian Library, University of Haifa

Kibbutzim
Kibbutz Movement
Former moshavim
Populated places established in 1898
Populated places established in 1916
Populated places established in 1939
1898 establishments in the Ottoman Empire
1916 establishments in the Ottoman Empire
1939 establishments in Mandatory Palestine
Populated places in Northern District (Israel)
Polish-Jewish culture in Israel